Religion in Samoa encompasses a range of groups, but 98% of the population of Samoa is Christian. The following is a distribution of Christian groups as of 2011 (the most recent census available): Congregational Christian (32 percent), Roman Catholic (19 percent), The Church of Jesus Christ of Latter-day Saints (15 percent), Methodist (14 percent), Assemblies of God (8 percent) and Seventh-day Adventist (4 percent). Groups together constituting less than 5 percent of the population include Baháʼí, Jehovah's Witnesses, Congregational Church of Jesus, Nazarene, nondenominational Protestant, Baptist, Worship Centre, Peace Chapel, Samoa Evangelism, Elim Church, and Anglican. (A comparison of the 2006 and 2011 censuses shows a slight decline in the membership of major denominations and an increase in participation in nontraditional and evangelical groups. Although there is no official estimate, there are reportedly small numbers of Hindus, Buddhists, Jews and traditional believers, primarily in Apia. The country has one of the world's eight Baháʼí Houses of Worship. There is a small Muslim community and one mosque. The history of Islam in Samoa dates back to before 1985, when Samoa had a number of Muslim workers who were working either for the government or for a United Nations program, but their number was small and hardly affected the local population. In the mid-1980s, the World Assembly of Muslim Youth began operating in the Pacific, and consequently some Samoans began converting to Islam. According to the 2001 census, the number of Samoan Muslims was 48, or 0.03% of the total population. This number has increased to 61 Muslims, or 0.04% of the population, according to the 2006 census. This number is expected to reach 73 Muslims by 2020.

Status of government respect for religious freedom
The constitution and other laws and policies protect religious freedom. The constitution provides for the right to choose, practice, and change the religion of one's choice. Legal protections cover discrimination or persecution by private as well as government actors.

The constitution provides freedom from unwanted religious education in schools and gives each religious group the right to establish its own schools. Nevertheless, a 2009 education policy, enforced since 2010, makes Christian instruction compulsory in public primary schools and optional in public secondary schools. The government institutes the policy inconsistently in government schools across the country, with little if any public concern or opposition. Church-run pastoral schools in most villages traditionally provide religious instruction after school hours.

The government observes the following religious holidays as national holidays: Good Friday, Easter Monday, White Monday (Children's Day), Feast of the Ascension and Christmas.

The government does not require religious groups to register.

A government-established commission charged with recommending possible constitutional amendments concerning religious freedom completed its collection of public submissions at the end of 2010. By the end of 2012, the government had not publicly released the report or tabled it in parliament.

In June 2017, the Samoan Parliament passed a bill to increase support for Christianity in the country's constitution, including a reference to the Trinity. According to The Diplomat, "What Samoa has done is shift references to Christianity into the body of the constitution, giving the text far more potential to be used in legal processes." The preamble to the constitution already described the country as "an independent State based on Christian principles and Samoan custom and traditions."

Status of societal respect for religious freedom
As of 2012, there were occasional reports of societal discrimination based on religious affiliation, belief, or practice. In addition prominent societal leaders repeatedly publicly emphasized that the country was Christian. Public discussion of religious issues often included negative references to non-Christian religions.

Traditionally, villages tended to have one primary Christian church. Village chiefs often chose the religious denomination of their extended families. Many larger villages had multiple churches serving different denominations and coexisting peacefully. However, new religious groups sometimes faced resistance when attempting to establish themselves in some villages.

There remained minor tensions between Fa'a Samoa (the Samoan way) and individual religious rights. One of the elements of Fa'a Samoa was the traditional, tightly-knit village community. Often, village elders and the community at large were not receptive toward those who attempted to introduce another denomination or religion into the community. While under-reported, observers stated that, in many villages throughout the country, leaders forbade individuals to belong to churches outside of the village or to exercise their right not to worship. Villagers in violation of such rules faced fines or banishment from the village.

There was a high level of religious observance and strong societal pressure at village and local levels to participate in church services and other activities, and to support church leaders and projects financially. In some denominations, financial contributions often totaled more than 30 percent of family income. This issue has gained media attention as some members of parliament have spoken out about pressure on families to give disproportionate amounts of their incomes to churches.

Demographics

Gallery

See also
 Baháʼí Faith in Samoa
 Roman Catholicism in Samoa
 Piula Theological College
 Samoan Assemblies of God
 Samoan mythology
 The Church of Jesus Christ of Latter-day Saints in Samoa

References